Michael Muhammad Knight (born 1977) is an American novelist, essayist, and journalist. His writings are popular among American Muslim youth. The San Francisco Chronicle described him as "one of the most necessary and, paradoxically enough, hopeful writers of Barack Obama's America," while The Guardian has described him as "the Hunter S. Thompson of Islamic literature," and his non-fiction work exemplifies the principles of gonzo journalism. Publishers Weekly describes him as "Islam's gonzo experimentalist." Within the American Muslim community, he has earned a reputation as an ostentatious cultural provocateur.

He obtained a Master of Theological Studies degree from Harvard University in 2011 and received his Ph.D. in Islamic studies from the University of North Carolina at Chapel Hill in 2016. Knight is currently assistant professor in the Department of Philosophy at the University of Central Florida.

Biography
Knight grew up in Geneva, New York, raised by his mother in a Catholic family of Irish descent.  Knight's first exposure to Islam came when he was 13 when he discovered Malcolm X through the lyrics of the hip-hop band, Public Enemy. After reading Alex Haley's Autobiography of Malcolm X at 15, Knight's study of Islam intensified and he converted to Islam. It was also at 15 that Knight met his father, Wesley Unger, for the first time since he was two years old; when Knight informed Unger that he was Muslim, Unger told Knight that he was a white supremacist. At 17, Knight traveled to Islamabad, Pakistan, to study Islam at Faisal Mosque. He came close to making the decision to abandon this course of study to join the war against Russian rule in Chechnya.

On August 2, 2009, he married Sadaf Khatri in San Jose, California.

Books

The Taqwacores
After disillusionment with orthodox Islam, Knight wrote two books, Where Mullahs Fear to Tread and The Furious Cock, which he printed as photocopied zines. In Winter 2002 he wrote The Taqwacores, which told the story of a fictitious group of Muslim punk-rockers living in Buffalo, New York. Characters included a straight edge Sunni, a drunken mohawk-wearing Sufi punk, a burqa-wearing riot grrrl and a Shi'i skinhead.

Knight originally self-published the novel as a spiral-bound photocopy and gave it away for free. The book was later picked up for distribution by Alternative Tentacles, the punk record label founded by Jello Biafra. An encounter with Peter Lamborn Wilson led to The Taqwacores being published by Autonomedia in 2004.

The Taqwacores was intended as Knight's farewell to Islam, but encouragement from readers caused Knight to reconsider his relationship to the faith. The novel has since inspired the start of an actual taqwacore scene, including bands such as the Kominas, Vote Hezbollah, and Secret Trial Five. Carl W. Ernst, specialist in Islamic studies at UNC, called The Taqwacores a "Catcher in the Rye for young Muslims." The novel has been taught in courses at SUNY Potsdam, Kenyon College, Vassar College, the University of Arkansas at Fayetteville, Trinity College, Sarah Lawrence College, Canisius College, New College of Florida, Indiana University, Michigan State University, and the Ohio State University.

The Taqwacores burqa-wearing riot grrrl, Rabeya, and her dialogue from the novel has been adapted in the Rapture Project, an ongoing puppet show regarding religion in American culture and politics. Rabeya, who in one passage of The Taqwacores gives a Friday sermon and leads the mixed-gender group in prayer, also influenced author Asra Nomani to organize a mixed-gender Jumu'ah held March 18, 2005, in New York and led by Quran scholar Dr. Amina Wadud in support of women as imams. Knight worked security for that Jumu'ah.

Blue-Eyed Devil
Knight's travel writing for Muslim WakeUp! led him to write Blue-Eyed Devil: an American Muslim Road Odyssey, in which he traveled over 20,000 miles by Greyhound bus in 60 days, searching for a true American Islam. Andrei Codrescu hailed the work as "today's On the Road ... pertinent and suspenseful, a mystery rendered in brilliant detail and gorgeous depth ... a masterpiece." In the book Knight attempts to uncover the true identity of W. D. Fard, the mysterious founder of the Nation of Islam, who was believed by that movement to be Allah in person.

Blue-Eyed Devil also contains narratives of Knight's encounters with various figures of North American Islam, such as Irshad Manji, Asra Nomani, and the Hasan family, founders of Muslims for Bush.  Knight describes his experience as a member of the original board of directors of the Progressive Muslim Union (PMU) and his disillusionment with the Progressive Islam movement.  In Blue-Eyed Devil, he claims that PMU considered an alliance with Manji, which he witnessed while having dinner with Manji and PMU founder Ahmed Nassef.

Knight left PMU in 2005. While maintaining a blog at ProgressiveIslam.Org, he continued to reject the term "Progressive Muslim."

The Five Percenters
Knight's fascination with Fard led him to research the Five-Percent Nation or "Nation of Gods and Earths", a movement that broke from the Nation of Islam in 1964. After spending time with the movement's white elder, Azreal, Knight was given the name Azreal Wisdom; in the Five Percenters' system of Supreme Mathematics, it means Azreal Two.

Knight wrote the first ethnography of the movement, The Five Percenters: Islam, Hip-hop and the Gods of New York (Oneworld Publications). An excerpt from the book appears in the 90-page booklet included with The 5% Album by Lord Jamar of Brand Nubian, which also features members of Wu-Tang Clan such as the RZA and GZA.

Osama Van Halen
Knight's 2009 novel, Osama Van Halen, features The Taqwacores Amazing Ayyub and Rabeya, who take Matt Damon hostage and demand that Hollywood depict Muslims in a more positive light, while Damon argues that they are "playing into that same terrorist paradigm and furthering a neo-conservative perception of Islam."  Also in the novel, Amazing Ayyub embarks on a mission to rid taqwacore of a Muslim pop punk band, Shah 79.  Amazing Ayyub's adventures include encounters with zombies, psychobilly jinns and Knight himself, who appears as a character in the story. At the end of the novel, Knight is decapitated by Rabeya. Laury Silvers of Skidmore College, who read the manuscript, wrote:

Impossible Man
Knight's memoir, released March 2009 by Soft Skull Press, tells the story of Knight's "bizarre and traumatic boyhood and his conversion to Islam during a turbulent adolescence."

From the book's catalog description:

Impossible Man follows a boy's struggle in coming to terms with his father—a paranoid schizophrenic and white supremacist who had threatened to decapitate Michael when he was a baby—and his father's place in his own identity. It is also the story of a teenager's troubled path to maturity and the influences that steady him along the way. Knight's encounter with Malcolm X's autobiography transforms him from a disturbed teenager engaged in correspondence with Charles Manson to a zealous Muslim convert who travels to Pakistan and studies in a madrassa. Later disillusioned by radical religion, he again faces the crisis of self-definition. For all its extremes, Impossible Man describes a universal journey: a wounded boy in search of a working model of manhood, going to outrageous lengths to find it.

Journey to the End of Islam
Journey to the End of Islam chronicles Knight's 2008 return to Pakistan, subsequent travels to Syria, Egypt, and Ethiopia, temporary relocation to Cleveland for the filming of The Taqwacores, and hajj in Mecca. Over the course of his travels, Knight compares and contrasts various Islamic interpretations and practices, juxtaposing heterodoxy and orthodoxy while also addressing issues of sexism and racism in Islam. While in Mecca, Knight syncretizes traditional Islam with his Five Percenter leanings, and also reconverts to Islam as a Shi'a in a tent of Iranian pilgrims. Publishers Weekly gave a mostly positive review, comparing the book to "the archetypal American road novel complete with a harrowing episode of cannabis-induced psychosis, a breezy tone ... and indifference to whether the reader can follow his references." The review also stated that Knight "probes and prods the boundaries of his faith with unabashed emotion and honesty, even questioning, near the end of his journey, whether he really understands anything about Islam. But the book is most engaging when he turns his gaze outward to make pithy observations on the intersection of religion and global capitalist culture."

Why I Am a Five Percenter
Why I Am a Five Percenter was released October 13, 2011, by Tarcher/Penguin Books. The book is a more personal sequel to Knight's first work on the Five Percenters, in which he covers his personal relationship to the Five Percenter community, focusing on the question of whether his research made him a true insider and considering ways in which his identities as white and Muslim complicate his connection to the community.

William S. Burroughs vs. the Qur'an
Knight's eighth book, William S. Burroughs vs. the Qur'an was released on April 1, 2012, by Soft Skull/Counterpoint. The book covers Knight's changing relationship with his mentor and hero, Peter Lamborn Wilson, and Knight's literary experimentation with the Qur'an using the cut-up methods of William S. Burroughs.

Tripping with Allah: Islam, Drugs, and Writing
The book, which was released on February 12, 2013, by Soft Skull/Counterpoint, follows Knight's experimentation with ayahuasca and attempts to integrate ayahuasca use into his Muslim practice, first through Santo Daime. Knight pursues and ultimately experiences a vision of Fatimah, daughter of the Prophet Muhammad. Much of the book relates to Knight's anxieties over remaining an artist while transitioning into an academic, as well as the impact of academic study on his relationship to religion.

Why I am a Salafi
Knight's tenth book, Why I am a Salafi was released in 2015 by Soft Skull/Counterpoint. The book begins after Knight's ayahuasca vision in Tripping with Allah, visiting a mosque in Los Angeles and performing conventional Muslim prayer while still feeling ayahuasca's effects. The book then becomes a critical reflection on issues of scriptural interpretation, traditionalism and religious revivalism, and the Salafi movement to which Knight converted as a teenager. Publishers Weekly named the book one of its "Best Books of 2015."

Magic in Islam
Knight's eleventh book, Magic in Islam was released in 2016 by Tarcher/Penguin Books. Magic in Islam examines traditions such as astrology, Hermeticism, amulets and talismans as practiced in Islamic contexts, with focus on deconstructing boundaries between Islam and other religions, as well as the divisions between magic and religion at large.

Controversy
At the 2005 convention of the Islamic Society of North America, Knight and the Kominas fraudulently obtained media passes and sneaked into the press conference of Karen Hughes, Under Secretary for Public Diplomacy and Public Affairs in the U.S. Department of State. They were taken outside and questioned by a State Department agent, but allowed back in by ISNA officials. It was later learned that the ISNA staff was concerned over Knight's jacket bearing the Alternative Tentacles logo.

Ibrahim Hooper
In a 2003 Muslim WakeUp! article, Knight claimed to have introduced himself to a member of the United Nation of Islam as "Ibrahim Hooper," the name of the Communications Director of the Council on American–Islamic Relations. Hooper threatened legal action if the act was repeated. In a later article on his trip to Elijah Muhammad's grave, Knight wrote that he had introduced himself as Ibrahim Hooper at the cemetery's office. Hooper again threatened legal recourses. Knight responded by publicly challenging Hooper to a wrestling match.

Asma Gull Hasan
In October 2007, Muslim Republican author and commentator Asma Gull Hasan filed a defamation suit against Knight and the Kominas, claiming that Blue-Eyed Devil falsely portrayed her as "wealthy, self-absorbed, insensitive and acutely uninformed" and that Knight had influenced the Kominas to write a song depicting her performance of a sex act. "You can't defeat writers by censoring or punishing them, you only defeat writers by outwriting them," Knight stated in a response to The Denver Post. "And she can't do that, so she has to resort to this." In November 2008, the suit was dismissed.

See also

 Anarchism and Islam
 Liberal Muslim movements

References

External links

 Review of The Taqwacores
 Article on the Kominas, Boston Globe
 The Rapture Project
 New York Times article on The Taqwacores
 Articles by Michael Muhammad Knight at VICE

Interviews
 by Mark Thwaite
 Blue Eyed Devil: An Interview with Michael Muhammad Knight by David Hunter
 Michael Muhammad Knight Interview September 23, 2008
 Q&A: Muslim punk author Michael Muhammad Knight talks Taqwacores, Buddhism, drugs, and the future May 8, 2009
 The Bat Segundo Show: Michael Muhammad Knight September 22, 2009
 Q&A: Michael Muhammad Knight on Punk Islam October 17, 2009
 Muslim Convert Chronicles Contradictions In The Faith - Interview with Michael Muhammad Knight by Jacki Lyden December 23, 2009
 Kill Your Patriarchs: An Interview with Michael Muhammad Knight by Hussein Rashid February 10, 2010

1977 births
Living people
American Muslims
American people of Irish descent
Muslim reformers
21st-century American novelists
American male journalists
Taqwacore
Five percenters
Converts to Islam
Punk people
Harvard Divinity School alumni
American male novelists
21st-century American male writers
University of North Carolina at Chapel Hill alumni
American expatriate musicians in Pakistan
American expatriates in Pakistan
21st-century American non-fiction writers